Jordan Nathaniel Bowery (born 2 July 1991) is an English professional footballer who plays as a forward for League Two club Mansfield Town.

Bowery has previously played for Crewe Alexandra, Chesterfield, Rotherham United, Aston Villa, Leyton Orient, Oxford United, Milton Keynes Dons, Barrow, Bradford City and Doncaster Rovers.

Career

Chesterfield
Born in Nottingham, Bowery represented Derby County as a schoolboy but was not signed as a scholar and eventually moved on to Chesterfield. Bowery made his professional debut for Chesterfield on 30 August 2008, in a 1–0 defeat against Wycombe Wanderers. On 19 November 2009, Bowery joined Conference Premier club Barrow on loan for six weeks. Bowery scored his first goal in the Football League on 29 January 2011, in a 2–2 home draw against Bradford City. On 15 September 2011, Bowery signed a contract extension to keep him at the club until June 2014.

Aston Villa
Bowery signed for Aston Villa on 31 August 2012. He signed on loan for Doncaster Rovers in February 2014.

Rotherham United

On 10 June 2014, Bowery joined Rotherham United for an undisclosed fee, breaking the Millers' transfer record of £160,000 for Lee Frecklington in January 2013. He signed on loan for Bradford City in November 2015. He left Rotherham by mutual consent in January 2016.

Oxford United
On 22 January, Bowery joined Oxford United on a deal until the end of the season. He scored 7 league goals in 9 starts and 8 substitute appearances and was part of the team that won promotion to League One, finishing second in League Two.

Leyton Orient
On 5 July 2016, Bowery joined Leyton Orient on a two-year deal upon his release from Oxford United.

Crewe Alexandra
He moved to Crewe Alexandra on loan in January 2017, and scored his first Crewe goal on 14 March at Crawley Town. On 9 May 2017, Crewe announced that Bowery would be returning to his parent club, however two weeks later on 23 May, Crewe announced that Bowery had signed a two-year contract with the club, as his Leyton Orient contract included a relegation release clause which allowed him to leave. After scoring 22 times in 99 games over two seasons, he was offered a new contract by Crewe at the end of the 2018–19 season, but declined to extend his stay at Gresty Road.

Milton Keynes Dons
On 11 June 2019, it was announced that Bowery would join newly promoted League One club Milton Keynes Dons on a free transfer effective from 1 July 2019. He scored his first goal for the club in a 3–2 defeat away to Wycombe Wanderers.

Mansfield Town
On 22 June 2020 it was announced that he would join Mansfield Town on 1 August 2020, after signing on a free transfer. Following defeat in the 2022 EFL League Two play-off Final, Bowery signed a new two-year contract.

Personal life
Bowery's father Bert Bowery was also a professional footballer who played in England and the United States.

Career statistics

Honours
Chesterfield
Football League Two: 2010–11
Football League Trophy: 2011–12

Oxford United
Football League Two runner-up: 2015–16

References

1991 births
Living people
English sportspeople of Saint Kitts and Nevis descent
Footballers from Nottingham
English footballers
Association football forwards
Chesterfield F.C. players
Barrow A.F.C. players
Aston Villa F.C. players
Doncaster Rovers F.C. players
Rotherham United F.C. players
Bradford City A.F.C. players
Oxford United F.C. players
Leyton Orient F.C. players
Crewe Alexandra F.C. players
Milton Keynes Dons F.C. players
Mansfield Town F.C. players
English Football League players
National League (English football) players
Premier League players